Hudson may refer to:

People 
 Hudson (given name)
 Hudson (surname)
 Hudson (footballer, born 1986), Hudson Fernando Tobias de Carvalho, Brazilian football right-back
 Hudson (footballer, born 1988), Hudson Rodrigues dos Santos, Brazilian football defensive midfielder
 Hudson (footballer, born 1996), Hudson Felipe Gonçalves, Brazilian football midfielder
 Hudson (footballer, born 2001), Hudson Alexandre Batista da Silva, Brazilian football defensive midfielder

Places

Argentina 
 Hudson, Buenos Aires Province, a town in Berazategui Partido

Australia 

 Hudson, Queensland, a locality in the Cassowardy Coast Region

Canada 
 Hudson, Ontario
 Hudson, Quebec
 Hudson, Edmonton, Alberta

United States 
 Hudson, Colorado, a town in Weld County
 Hudson, Florida, a census-designated place in Pasco County
 Hudson, Illinois, a town in McLean County
 Hudson, Indiana, a town in Steuben County
 Hudson, Iowa, a town in Black Hawk County
 Hudson, Kansas, a town in Stafford County
 Hudson, Maine, a town in Penobscot County
 Hudson, Massachusetts, a town in Middlesex County
 Hudson (CDP), Massachusetts, the main village in the town
 Hudson, Michigan, a town in Lenawee County
 Hudson, Missouri, an unincorporated community
 Hudson, New Hampshire, a town in Hillsborough County
 Hudson (CDP), New Hampshire, the urban part of the town
 Hudson, New York, a city in Columbia County
 Hudson, North Carolina, a town in Caldwell County
 Hudson, Ohio, a city in Summit County
 Hudson, Pennsylvania, part of Plains Township
 Hudson, South Dakota, a town in Lincoln County
 Hudson, Texas, a town in Angelina County
 Hudson (town), Wisconsin, in St. Croix County
 Hudson, Wisconsin, a city in the town
 Hudson, Wyoming, a town in Fremont County
 Hudson County, New Jersey
 Hudson Square, Manhattan, a neighborhood in New York City

Geographical features 

 Hudson Bay, in northeastern Canada
 Hudson Gardens, in Littleton, Colorado, US
 Hudson Island (or Coolah Island), the southernmost island of the Family Islands group, east of Tully Heads
 Hudson River, a river mainly in New York State, US 
 Hudson Valley, a river valley formed by the Hudson River
 Mid-Hudson Region, within Hudson Valley
 Hudson Strait, connecting Hudson Bay to the Atlantic Ocean in Canada
 Mount Hudson, a volcano in Chile

Arts, entertainment, and media

Fictional characters
 Angus Hudson, the butler in the 1970s British period drama Upstairs, Downstairs
 Hudson (gargoyle), a character in Disney's 1994 Gargoyles series
 Doc Hudson, a 2006 anthropomorphic automobile from the Disney Cars franchise

Other uses in arts, entertainment, and media
 Hudson River School, a 19th-century (1800's) American artistic genre
 Hudson Brothers, a 1965 American music group
 Hudson Valley (magazine), 1971
 Hudson Hawk, a 1991 film starring Bruce Willis
 Hudson (album), a 2017 jazz album by Jack DeJohnette, John Medeski, John Scofield, and Larry Grenadier

Brands and enterprises
 Hudson Boatworks, a racing shell manufacturer in London, Ontario (1981 to present)
 Hudson Foods Company of Rogers, Arkansas
 Hudson Group, a retail newspaper stand company
 Hudson Soft, a former Japanese video game publisher and developer
 Hudson's, a defunct Detroit-based department store chain
 Hudson's Bay Company, an English (later Canadian) fur trading and retail company, founded 1670
 Robert Hudson (company), a defunct locomotive manufacturer

Computing 
 Hudson (software), a continuous integration tool
 Hudson, a  codename for the Fusion controller hub (FCH) chipset on AMD motherboards

Transport 
 Hudson station (RTM), an 1800s commuter rail station in Hudson, Quebec, Canada
 Hudson station (New York), an 1874 train station in Hudson, New York
 USRC Hudson (1893), a U.S. Revenue Service cutter from the Battle of Cárdenas
 Hudson, the generic name in most of North America for any steam locomotive with an 1896 4-6-4 wheel arrangement
 Hudson (steam automobile) (1901–1902)
 Hudson Motor Car Company, 1909, (merged in 1954 with American Motors)
 Hudson Super Six, an automobile (1916-1926, 1933, 1940-1950)
 Hudson Greater Eight, a line of automobiles (1931–1932)
 Hudson Utility Coupe, an automobile (1937–1942)
 Hudson Commodore, an automobile (1941–1952)
 Hudson Hornet, an automobile (1951–1954)
Fabulous Hudson Hornet, 1951, a famous NASCAR Grand National and AAA stock car
 Hudson Wasp, an automobile (1952–1954)
 Hudson Jet, a compact automobile (1953–1954)
 Hudson Italia, a two-door compact coupé (1954–1955)
 NYC Hudson, a class of locomotives used by New York Central in the 1930s
 Henry Hudson Bridge, 1936, in New York City
 Royal Hudson, a type of locomotive used by Canadian Pacific Railway 1937–1960
 Lockheed Hudson, a 1938 World War II aircraft
 USS Hudson (DD-475), a United States Navy destroyer (1943–1946)
 CCGS Hudson, a 1963 Canadian Coast Guard research vessel

Other uses
 Hudson Institute, an American conservative think tank
 Hudson Project, a powerline supplying New York City
 Hudson v. McMillian, a United States Supreme Court decision concerning treatment of prisoners
 Hudson Valley Renegades, an American minor league baseball team

See also 
 Hudson Township (disambiguation)
 Justice Hudson (disambiguation)